Tub  may refer to:
A tub (container):
a  round or oblong container with or without a lid:
a plant pot
a shallow, plastic or paper container, typically with a lid or closure
Tub (unit), a former quantity for sale or butter or cheese
A bathtub, a plumbing fixture for bathing
Hot tub, a large bath or small pool designed to comfortably hold multiple persons
Quarry tub, a type of railway or tramway wagon
Slack tub, in blacksmithing, a quench
Tub boat, an unpowered cargo boat used on early canals
Twin tub, a type of washing machine
Tub file, in computing, an early, primitive random access memory technology.
Tub Welch, a baseball player.

TUB may refer to:
TUB (gene)
Citroën TUB, a light van
Technical University of Berlin (Germany)
Transports Urbains du Beauvaisis, local public transport operator in northern France
Tubuai – Mataura Airport (IATA airport code)

TUBS or Tubs may refer to:
Time unit box system, a system for notating events that happen over a time period.
Tokai University Boarding School in Denmark
Ryan Tubridy, Irish television and radio presenter.

See also
 Tubb
 Tubbs
 Tube (disambiguation)